The Roman Catholic Diocese of Keimoes–Upington is a South African diocese located around  the towns of Keimoes and Upington (ZF Mgcawu District Municipality, Northern Cape) in the Ecclesiastical province of Bloemfontein.

History
 June 20, 1885: Established as Apostolic Prefecture of Orange River from the Apostolic Prefecture of Cape of Good Hope, Central District 
 May 2, 1898: Promoted as Apostolic Vicariate of Orange River
 July 9, 1940: Renamed as Apostolic Vicariate of Keimoes
 January 11, 1951: Promoted as Diocese of Keimoes
 February 8, 1985: Renamed as Diocese of Keimoes – Upington

Special churches
The Cathedral is the Cathedral of the Immaculate Conception in Pella (Namakwa District Municipality).  The Co-Cathedral is the Co-Cathedral of St. Augustine in Upington.

Bishops
 Vicars Apostolic of Orange River (Roman rite) 
 Bishop Jean-Marie Simon, O.S.F.S. (1886 – 1898.05.03)
 Bishop Anthony Gaughren, O.M.I. (1886.06.08 – 1901.01.15)
 Bishop Jean-Marie Simon, O.S.F.S. (1898.05.03 – 1932.11.21)
 Bishop Odilon Fages, O.S.F.S. (1932.11.21 – 1939.10.14)
 Vicar Apostolic of Keimoes (Roman rite) 
 Bishop Henry Joseph Thünemann, O.S.F.S. (1940.07.09 – 1951.01.11 see below)
 Bishops of Keimoes (Roman rite)
 Bishop Henry Joseph Thünemann, O.S.F.S. (see above 1951.01.11 – 1962.09.12)
 Bishop Francis Esser, O.S.F.S. (1962.09.12 – 1966.12.08)
 Bishop John Baptist Minder, O.S.F.S. (1967.10.12 – 1985.02.08 see below)
 Bishops of Keimoes–Upington (Roman rite)
 Bishop John Baptist Minder, O.S.F.S. (see above 1985.02.08 – 2000.07.05)
 Bishop Edward Gabriel Risi, O.M.I. (since 2000.07.05)

Coadjutor Bishops
Francis Xavier Esser, O.S.F.S. (1955-1962)
Odilon Fages, O.S.F.S. (1928-1932), as Coadjutor Vicar Apostolic

See also
Roman Catholicism in South Africa

Sources

 GCatholic.org
 Catholic Hierarchy
 Diocese of Keimoes–Upington Website

Keimoes-Upington
Keimoes-Upington
Keimoes-Upington
1885 establishments in the British Empire
Roman Catholic Ecclesiastical Province of Bloemfontein
Namakwa District Municipality
ZF Mgcawu District Municipality